Miss America's Outstanding Teen 2014 was the 8th Miss America's Outstanding Teen pageant held at the Linda Chapin Theater in the Orange County Convention Center in Orlando, Florida on August 17, 2013. At the conclusion of the event, Rachel Wyatt of South Carolina crowned her successor Leah Sykes of Florida. Miss America 2013 Mallory Hytes Hagen was a host of the event.

Results

Placements

Awards

Preliminary Awards

Non-finalist Awards

Teens in Action Awards

Top Ad Sales Awards

Other Awards

Contestants

References

2014
2014 in Florida
2014 beauty pageants